The following lists events that happened during 1939 in Chile.

Incumbents
President of Chile: Pedro Aguirre Cerda

Events

August
25 August – The Ariostazo failed coup attempt occurs.

Births 
10 January – Jorge Toro
9 April – Hugo Villanueva
26 May – Alejandro Foxley
22 June – Luis Eyzaguirre
8 December – Humberto Cruz
25 December – Claudio Huepe (d. 2009)

Deaths
11 November – Pedro Nolasco Cruz Vergara (b. 1857)

References 

 
Years of the 20th century in Chile
Chile